French legislative elections took place on 21 and 28 March 1993 to elect the tenth National Assembly of the Fifth Republic.

Since 1988, President François Mitterrand and his Socialist cabinets had relied on a relative parliamentary majority. In an attempt to avoid having to work with the Communists, Prime Minister Michel Rocard tried to gain support from the UDF by appointing four UDF ministers. After the UDF withdrew its support for the government in 1991, Rocard and the UDF ministers resigned. The UDF then became allied with the Gaullist Rally for the Republic (RPR).

The Socialist Party (PS) was further weakened by scandals (involving illicit financing, contaminated blood and other affairs) and an intense rivalry between François Mitterrand's potential successors (Lionel Jospin and Laurent Fabius). In March 1992, the Socialists were punished at the local elections. Prime Minister Édith Cresson was replaced by Pierre Bérégovoy. The latter promised to fight against economic recession and corruption, but he was himself suspected to have received a loan from a controversial businessman, Roger-Patrice Pelat.
 
The election was a landslide victory for the RPR-UDF alliance, while the PS and their left-wing allies received their worst result since the 1960s. The PS lost nearly 80% of the seats they had held at the time of the chamber's dissolution. This caused a crisis within the PS; Fabius lost his position as First Secretary in favour of Rocard, who claimed that a political "big bang" was needed. Jospin announced his political retirement after he was defeated in his Haute-Garonne constituency. Depressed by the defeat and the accusations about the loan from Pelat, Pierre Bérégovoy committed suicide on 1 May.

Some traditional PS voters had voted for the Greens in the first round. These ecologists obtained a total of 10.84%, making this the best total score for French Green parties in legislative elections. However, only two ecologists qualified for the runoff, including Dominique Voynet in her constituency in the Doubs département. Both of these candidates were eventually defeated. Lack of major political allies for these ecologists explained this failure to take any seats.

The RPR-UDF coalition formed the largest parliamentary majority since 1958, taking a total of 485 seats or 84% of the 577 seats. The RPR leader Jacques Chirac demanded President Mitterrand's resignation and refused to be Prime Minister in a new "cohabitation" government. Finally, he suggested the nomination of his former RPR Finance Minister Edouard Balladur at the head of the government. Balladur promised publicly that he would not run against Chirac for the next presidential election. The second "cohabitation" finished with the 1995 presidential election.

Results 

|-
! style="background-color:#E9E9E9;text-align:left;vertical-align:top;" rowspan=2 colspan=3 width=600 |Parties and coalitions
! style="background-color:#E9E9E9;text-align:center;" colspan=2 |1st round
! style="background-color:#E9E9E9;text-align:center;" colspan=2 |2nd round
! style="background-color:#E9E9E9" rowspan=2|Total seats
|-
! style="background-color:#E9E9E9;text-align:right;" |Votes
! style="background-color:#E9E9E9;text-align:right;" |%
! style="background-color:#E9E9E9;text-align:right;" |Votes
! style="background-color:#E9E9E9;text-align:right;" |%
|-
| style="background-color:"|
| style="text-align:left;" | Rally for the Republic (Rassemblement pour la République)
| style="text-align:right;" | RPR
| style="text-align:right;" | 5,032,496
| style="text-align:right;" | 20.08
| style="text-align:right;" | 5,741,629
| style="text-align:right;" | 28.99
| style="text-align:right;" | 242
|-
| style="background-color:"|
| style="text-align:left;" | Union for French Democracy (Union pour la démocratie française)
| style="text-align:right;" | UDF
| style="text-align:right;" | 4,731,013
| style="text-align:right;" | 18.71
| style="text-align:right;" | 5,178,039
| style="text-align:right;" | 26.14
| style="text-align:right;" | 207
|-
| style="background-color:#4C4CB0"|
| style="text-align:left;" | Miscellaneous Right
| style="text-align:right;" | DVD
| style="text-align:right;" | 1,118,032
| style="text-align:right;" | 4.46
| style="text-align:right;" | 588,455
| style="text-align:right;" | 2.97
| style="text-align:right;" | 36
|- style="background-color:lightblue"
| style="text-align:left;" colspan=2|Total "Union for France" (Right)
|
| style="text-align:right;" | 10,881,541
| style="text-align:right;" | 43.25
| style="text-align:right;" | 11,508,123
| style="text-align:right;" | 58.01
| style="text-align:right;" | 485
|-
| style="background-color:"|
| style="text-align:left;" | Socialist Party (Parti socialiste)
| style="text-align:right;" | PS
| style="text-align:right;" | 4,415,495 
| style="text-align:right;" | 17.61
| style="text-align:right;" | 6,143,179
| style="text-align:right;" | 31.01
| style="text-align:right;" | 53
|-
| style="background-color:#FF0000"|
| style="text-align:left;" | French Communist Party (Parti communiste français)
| style="text-align:right;" | PCF
| style="text-align:right;" | 2,331,339
| style="text-align:right;" | 9.30
| style="text-align:right;" | 951,213
| style="text-align:right;" | 4.80
| style="text-align:right;" | 24
|-
| style="background-color:#DA7B8B"|
| style="text-align:left;" | Miscellaneous Left  including the Movement of Left Radicals (Mouvement des radicaux de gauche)
| style="text-align:right;" | DVG-MRG
| style="text-align:right;" | 693,945
| style="text-align:right;" | 2.77
| style="text-align:right;" | unknown 
| style="text-align:right;" | unknown
| style="text-align:right;" | 14
|- style="background-color:pink"
| style="text-align:left;" colspan=2| Total Left ("Presidential Majority" and PCF)
|
| style="text-align:right;" | 7,440,779
| style="text-align:right;" | 29.68
| style="text-align:right;" | 7,094,392
| style="text-align:right;" | 35.81
| style="text-align:right;" | 91
|-
| style="background-color:#00c000"|
| style="text-align:left;" | The Greens (Les Verts)
| style="text-align:right;" | VEC
| style="text-align:right;" | 1,022,196
| style="text-align:right;" | 4.08
| style="text-align:right;" | 37,491
| style="text-align:right;" | 0.19
| style="text-align:right;" | -
|-
| style="background-color:#2E8B57"|
| style="text-align:left;" | Ecology Generation (Génération Écologie)
| style="text-align:right;" | GE
| style="text-align:right;" | 917,228
| style="text-align:right;" | 3.66
| style="text-align:right;" | -
| style="text-align:right;" | -
| style="text-align:right;" | -
|-
| style="background-color:limegreen"|
| style="text-align:left;" | New Ecology (Nouvelle Écologie)
| style="text-align:right;" | GE
| style="text-align:right;" | 635,244
| style="text-align:right;" | 2.53
| style="text-align:right;" | -
| style="text-align:right;" | -
| style="text-align:right;" | -
|-
| style="background-color:#77ff77"|
| style="text-align:left;" | Ecologists
|
| style="text-align:right;" | 141,645
| style="text-align:right;" | 0.57
| style="text-align:right;" | -
| style="text-align:right;" | -
| style="text-align:right;" | -
|- style="background-color:lightgreen"
| style="text-align:left;" colspan=2| Total Ecologists
|
| style="text-align:right;" | 2,716,313
| style="text-align:right;" | 11.00
| style="text-align:right;" | 37,491
| style="text-align:right;" | 0.19
| style="text-align:right;" | 0
|-
| style="background-color:"|
| style="text-align:left;" | National Front (Front national)
| style="text-align:right;" | FN
| style="text-align:right;" | 3,152,543
| style="text-align:right;" | 12.58
| style="text-align:right;" | 1,168,160
| style="text-align:right;" | 5.90
| style="text-align:right;" | 0
|-
| style="background-color:#C41E3A"|
| style="text-align:left;" | Far-Left
|
| style="text-align:right;" | 423,282
| style="text-align:right;" | 1.69
| style="text-align:right;" | -
| style="text-align:right;" | -
| style="text-align:right;" | -
|-
|
| style="text-align:left;" | Miscellaneous
|
| style="text-align:right;" | 329,275
| style="text-align:right;" | 1.31
| style="text-align:right;" | -
| style="text-align:right;" | -
| style="text-align:right;" | -
|-
| style="background-color:#003366"|
| style="text-align:left;" | Nationalist right and Eurosceptics
|
| style="text-align:right;" | 70,920
| style="text-align:right;" | 0.28
| style="text-align:right;" | -
| style="text-align:right;" | -
| style="text-align:right;" | -
|-
| style="background-color:#80461B"|
| style="text-align:left;" | Far-right
|
| style="text-align:right;" | 35,411
| style="text-align:right;" | 0.14
| style="text-align:right;" | -
| style="text-align:right;" | -
| style="text-align:right;" | -
|-
| style="background-color:#dddd00"|
| style="text-align:left;" | Regionalists
|
| style="text-align:right;" | 35,411
| style="text-align:right;" | 0.14
| style="text-align:right;" | -
| style="text-align:right;" | -
| style="text-align:right;" | -
|-
|
| style="text-align:left;" | Total
|
| style="text-align:right;" | 25,378,158
| style="text-align:right;" | 100.00
| style="text-align:right;" | 20,616,533
| style="text-align:right;" | 100.00
| style="text-align:right;" | 577
|-
| style="text-align:left;" colspan=6 | Abstention: 31.08% (1st round); 32.44% (2nd round)
|}

Assembly by Parliamentary Group

1993
1993 elections in France